XHRCG-FM is a radio station in Ciudad Acuña, Coahuila, Mexico broadcasting on 105.1 FM and carrying a Regional Mexican format known as RCG Radio. It is owned by Saltillo-based Grupo RCG; the group's two Ciudad Acuña radio stations, XHRCG and XHRG-FM 95.5 are operated by RCommunications. The US company is owned by Roberto G. González, the son of Roberto Casimiro González, founder of Grupo RCG.

History

The concession for the station was obtained in March 1959 for XEAE-AM 1600, changing calls to XERCG-AM in the 1990s. The station migrated to FM late in the 2000s.

At one point in the early 2010s, R Communications operated XHRCG from Del Rio, Texas as D-Rock, a rock music format.

References

Spanish-language radio stations
Radio stations in Coahuila
Mexican radio stations with expired concessions